Orku District is a district within the Xinjiang Uyghur Autonomous Region and is under the administrative jurisdiction of the Karamay City. According to the 2002 census, it has a population of 10,000.

Orku District is supplied with water by the Baiyang River and the Irtysh–Karamay Canal.

Transport
China National Highway 217

County-level divisions of Xinjiang